Stockhausen is a German surname.  

Notable people with the name include:

 Adam Stockhausen, American production designer
 Adolf Stockhausen, German athlete, silver medalist of Rugby union at the 1900 Summer Olympics
 August von Stockhausen (1791–1861), Prussian Minister of War in 1850–1851
 Samuel Stockhausen, German 17th-century physician, studied the effects of lead poisoning
 Franz Anton Adam Stockhausen, German virtuoso harpist
 Margarethe Stockhausen (1803–1877), soprano singer, wife of Franz
 Julius Stockhausen (1826–1906), singer and singing teacher, son of Franz
 Franz Stockhausen (1839–1926), pianist and conductor, son of Franz
 Karlheinz Stockhausen (1928–2007), German composer
 Doris Stockhausen (born 1924), German music educator, first wife of Karlheinz, mother of Markus
 Markus Stockhausen (born 1957), trumpeter and composer, son of Karlheinz
 Simon Stockhausen (born 1967), composer, son of Karlheinz

German-language surnames
German toponymic surnames